Hypoxystis is a genus of moths in the family Geometridae described by Prout in 1915.

Species
Hypoxystis mandli Schawerda, 1924
Hypoxystis pluviaria (Fabricius, 1787)
Hypoxystis pulcherata (Herz, 1905)

References

Ennominae